Sestrin 1, also known as p53-regulated protein PA26, is a protein that in humans is encoded by the SESN1 gene. 
This gene encodes a member of the sestrin family. Sestrins are induced by the p53 tumor suppressor protein and play a role in the cellular response to DNA damage and oxidative stress. 
The encoded protein mediates p53 inhibition of cell growth by activating AMP-activated protein kinase, which results in the inhibition of the mammalian target of rapamycin protein. The encoded protein also plays a critical role in antioxidant defense by regenerating overoxidized peroxiredoxins, and the expression of this gene is a potential marker for exposure to radiation. Alternatively spliced transcript variants encoding multiple isoforms have been observed for this gene.

See also
 SESN2

References

Further reading